The Sarvāstivāda (Pali: 𑀲𑀩𑁆𑀩𑀢𑁆𑀣𑀺𑀯𑀸𑀤) was one of the early Buddhist schools established around the reign of Ashoka (3rd century BCE). It was particularly known as an Abhidharma tradition, with a unique set of seven Abhidharma works.

The Sarvāstivādins were one of the most influential Buddhist monastic groups, flourishing throughout North India (especially Kashmir) and Central Asia until the 7th century. The orthodox Kashmiri branch of the school composed the large and encyclopedic Mahāvibhāṣa Śāstra around the time of the reign of Kanishka (c. 127–150 CE). Because of this, orthodox Sarvāstivādins who upheld the doctrines in the Mahāvibhāṣa were called Vaibhāṣikas.

According to the Theravādin Dipavamsa, the Sarvastivada emerged from the older Mahīśāsaka school; but the Śāriputraparipṛcchā and the Samayabhedoparacanacakra state that the Mahīśāsaka emerged from the Sarvastivada. The Sarvāstivādins are believed to have given rise to the Mūlasarvāstivāda sect as well as the Sautrāntika tradition, although the relationship between these groups has not yet been fully determined.

Name

Sarvāstivāda is a Sanskrit term that can be glossed as: "the theory of all that exists". The Sarvāstivāda argued that all dharmas exist in the past, present and future, the "three times". Vasubandhu's Abhidharmakośakārikā states, "He who affirms the existence of the dharmas of the three time periods [past, present and future] is held to be a Sarvāstivādin."

Although there is some dispute over how the word "Sarvāstivāda" is to be analyzed, the general consensus is that it is to be parsed into three parts: sarva "all" or "every" + asti "exist" + vada "speak", "say" or "theory". This equates perfectly with the Chinese term, Shuōyīqièyǒu bù, which is literally "the sect that speaks of the existence of everything," as used by Xuanzang and other translators.

The Sarvāstivāda was also known by other names, particularly hetuvada and yuktivada. Hetuvada comes from hetu – 'cause', which indicates their emphasis on causation and conditionality. Yuktivada comes from yukti – 'reason' or even 'logic', which echoes their use of rational argument and syllogism.

Origination and history

Early history 
According to Charles Prebish, "there is a great deal of mystery surrounding the rise and early development of the Sarvāstivādin school." According to Dhammajoti, "its presence, as well as that of its rival — the Vibhajyavāda lineage — in the time of Emperor Aśoka is beyond doubt. Since Aśoka's reign is around 268–232 B.C.E., this means that at least by the middle of the 3rd century B.C.E., it had already developed into a distinct school."

In Central Asia, several Buddhist monastic groups were historically prevalent. According to some accounts, the Sarvāstivādins emerged from the Sthavira nikāya, a small group of conservatives, who split from the reformist majority Mahāsāṃghikas at the Second Buddhist council. According to this account, they were expelled from Magadha, and moved to northwestern India where they developed into the Sarvāstivādin school.

A number of scholars have identified three distinct major phases of missionary activity seen in the history of Buddhism in Central Asia, which are associated with respectively the Dharmaguptaka, Sarvāstivāda, and the Mūlasarvāstivāda, and the origins of the Sarvāstivāda have also been related to Ashoka sending Majjhantika (Sanskrit: Madhyāntika) on a mission to Gandhara, which had an early presence of the Sarvāstivāda. The Sarvāstivādins in turn are believed to have given rise to the Mūlasarvāstivāda sect, although the relationship between these two groups has not yet been fully determined. According to Prebish, "this episode corresponds well with one Sarvāstivādin tradition stating that Madhyantika converted the city of Kasmir, which seems to have close ties with Gandhara."

A third tradition says that a community of Sarvāstivādin monks was established at Mathura by the patriarch Upagupta. In the Sarvāstivādin tradition Upagupta is said to have been the fifth patriarch after Mahākaśyapa, Ānanda, Madhyāntika, and Śāṇakavāsin, and in the Ch'an tradition he is regarded as the fourth.

Kushan era

The Sarvāstivāda enjoyed the patronage of Kanishka (c. 127–150 CE) emperor of the Kushan Empire, during which time they were greatly strengthened, and became one of the dominant sects of Buddhism in north India for centuries, flourishing throughout Northwest India, North India, and Central Asia.

When the Sarvāstivāda school held a synod in Kashmir during the reign of Kanishka II (c. 158–176), the most important Sarvāstivāda Abhidharma text, the Astagrantha of Katyayaniputra was rewritten and revised in Sanskrit. This revised text was now known as Jñānaprasthāna ("Course of Knowledge"). Though the Gandharan Astagrantha had many vibhaṣas (commentaries), the new Kashmiri Jñānaprasthāna had a Sanskrit Mahāvibhaṣa, compiled by the Kashmir Sarvāstivāda synod. The Jñānaprasthāna and its Mahāvibhaṣa, were then declared to be the new orthodoxy by Kashmiris, who called themselves Vaibhāṣikas.

This new Vaibhāṣika orthodoxy, however, was not readily accepted by all Sarvāstivādins. Some "Western masters" from Gandhara and Bactria had divergent views which disagreed with the new Kashmiri orthodoxy. These disagreements can be seen in post-Mahāvibhaṣa works, such as the *Tattvasiddhi-Śāstra  (成實論), the *Abhidharmahṛdaya (T no. 1550) and its commentaries (T no. 1551, no. 1552), the Abhidharmakośakārikā of Vasubandhu and its commentaries (who critiqued some orthodox views), and the *Nyāyānusāra (Ny) of master Saṃghabhadra (ca fifth century CE) who formulated the most robust Vaibhāṣika response to the new criticisms.

Tarim Basin
When the Chinese pilgrim Xuanzang visited Kucha in 630 CE, he received the favours of Suvarna-deva, the son and successor of Suvarna-puspa, and Hinayana king of Kucha. Xuanzang described in many details the characteristics of Kucha, and probably visited the Kizil Caves. Of the religion of the people of Kucha, he says that they were Sarvastivadas and writes:

Sub-schools 
Sarvāstivāda was a widespread group, and there were different sub-schools or sects throughout its history, the most influential ones being the Vaibhāṣika and the Sautrāntika schools. According to Cox, Willemen and Dessein: we have, basically, to differentiate the original Sarvāstivādins originating from Mathura, the Kaśmīri Vaibhāṣikas, the Western Masters of Gandhara and Bactria (the Dārṣṭāntika-Sautrāntika Masters) who were also referred to as Bahirdesaka, Aparāntaka and Pāścāttya, and the Mūlasarvāstivādins. As the various groups influenced one another, even these sub-schools do very often not form homogeneous groups.

Vaibhāṣika 

The Vaibhāṣika was formed by adherents of the Mahāvibhāṣa Śāstra (MVŚ) during the council of Kashmir. Since then, it comprised the orthodox or mainstream branch of the Sarvāstivāda school based in Kāśmīra (though not exclusive to this region). The Vaibhāśika-Sarvāstivāda, which had by far the most "comprehensive edifice of doctrinal systematics" of the early Buddhist schools, was widely influential in India and beyond.

As noted by KL Dhammajoti, "It is important to realize that not all of them necessarily subscribed to each and every view sanctioned by the MVŚ compilers. Moreover, the evolving nature of the Vaibhāṣika views must be recognized as well."

The Vaibhāśika-Sarvāstivādins are sometimes referred to in the MVŚ as "the Ābhidharmikas", "the Sarvāstivāda theoreticians" and "the masters of Kāśmīra." In various texts, they also referred to their tradition as Yuktavāda (the doctrine of logic), as well as Hetuvāda (the doctrine of causes).

The Vaibhāṣika school saw itself as the orthodox Sarvāstivāda tradition, and they were united in their doctrinal defense of the theory of  "all exists" (sarvām asti). This is the doctrine which held that dharmas, past present and future, all exist. This doctrine has been described as an eternalist theory of time.

While the Vaibhāṣikas held that dharmas of the three times all exist, they held that only present dharmas have "efficacy" (karitra), thus they were able to explain how the present seems to function differently than the past or future. Among the different Sarvāstivāda thinkers, there were different ideas on how this theory was to be understood. These differences were accepted as long as they did not contradict the doctrine of "all exists" and can be seen in the MVŚ, which outlines the four different interpretations of this doctrine by the ‘four great Ābhidharmikas of the Sarvāstivāda’: Dharmatrāta, Buddhadeva, Vasumitra and Ghoṣaka.

The doctrines of Sarvāstivāda were not confined to 'all exists', but also include the theory of momentariness (ksanika), conjoining (samprayukta) and causal simultaneity (sahabhu), conditionality (hetu and pratyaya), a unique presentation of the spiritual path (marga), and others. These doctrines are all inter-connected and it is the principle of 'all exists' that is the axial doctrine holding the larger movement together when the precise details of other doctrines are at stake.

In order to explain how it is possible for a dharma to remain the same and yet also undergo change as it moves through the three times, the Vaibhāṣika held that dharmas have a constant essence (svabhāva) which persists through the three times. The term was also identified as a unique mark or own characteristic (svalaksana) that differentiated a dharma and remained unchangeable throughout its existence. According to Vaibhāṣikas, svabhavas are those things that exist substantially (dravyasat) as opposed to those things which are made up of aggregations of dharmas and thus only have a nominal existence (prajñaptisat).

Dārṣṭāntikas and Sautrāntikas 

The Sautrāntikas ("those who uphold the sūtras"), also known as Dārṣṭāntikas (who may or may not have been a separate but related group), did not uphold the Mahāvibhāṣa Śāstra, but rather emphasized the Buddhist sūtras as being authoritative.

Already by the time of the MVŚ, the early Dārṣṭāntikas such as Dharmatrāta and Buddhadeva, existed as a school of thought within the fold of the Sarvāstivāda who disagreed with the orthodox views. These groups were also called "the western masters" (pāścātya), the foreign masters (bahirdeśaka; also called ‘the masters outside Kaśmīra’, and the ‘Gāndhārian masters’). They studied the same Abhidharma texts as other Sarvāstivādins, but in a more critical way. According to KL Dhammajoti, they eventually came to repudiate the Sarvāstivāda doctrine of "all exists."

It is this group, i.e. those who rejected the most important Sarvāstivāda doctrine (along with numerous other key Vaibhāṣika views), which came to be called Sautrāntika (those who rely on sutras). The Sautrāntikas did not reject abhidharma however, in fact they were the authors of several abhidharma manuals, like the *Abhidharmahṛdaya.

The most important Sautrāntika was Vasubandhu (ca. 350–430), a native from Purusapura in Gandhara. He is famous for his Abhidharmakośa, a very influential abhidharma work, with an auto commentary that defends Sautrāntika views. He famously later converted to the Yogacara school of Mahayana, a tradition that itself developed out of the Sarvāstivāda Abhidharma.

Vasubandhu's Kośa led to a vigorous reaction from his contemporary, the brilliant Vaibhāṣika master Saṃghabhadra, who is said to have spent 12 years composing the *Nyāyānusāra (a commentary to Vasubandhu's verses) to refute Vasubandhu and other Sautrāntikas such as Sthavira Śrīlāta and his pupil Rāma.

The Kośa was so influential that  it became the Abhidharma text par excellence in both East Asian Buddhism and Indo-Tibetan Buddhism. Even today, it remains the main text for the study of Abhidharma in these traditions.

The later Buddhist tradition of pramāṇa founded by Dignāga and Dharmakīrti is also associated with the Sautrāntika school.

Mūlasarvāstivādins

There is much uncertainty as to the relationship of the Mūlasarvāstivāda (meaning root or original Sarvāstivāda) school and the others. They were certainly influential in spreading their Mūlasarvāstivāda Vinaya, as it remains the monastic rule used in Indo-Tibetan Buddhism today. Also, they seem to have been influential in Indonesia by the 7th century, as noted by Yijing.

A number of theories have been posited by academics as to how the two are related including:

 Frauwallner holds that Mūlasarvāstivāda was the community of Mathura, which was an independent group from the Sarvāstivādins of Kaśmir. According to Bhikkhu Sujato, this theory has "stood the test of time".
 Lamotte thought that the Mūlasarvāstivāda Vinaya was a late compilation from Kaśmīr. 
 Warder suggests that the Mūlasarvāstivādins was a late group who compiled a Vinaya and the Saddharmasmṛtyupasthāna Sūtra.
 Enomoto holds that the Sarvāstivādin and Mūlasarvāstivādin were the same. 
 Willemen, Dessein, and Cox hold that this group is really the Sautrāntika school who renamed themselves in the later years of the Sarvāstivāda school history.

Texts

Vinaya
The Dharmaguptaka are known to have rejected the authority of the Sarvāstivāda pratimokṣa rules on the grounds that the original teachings of the Buddha had been lost.

The complete Sarvāstivāda Vinaya is extant in the Chinese Buddhist canon. In its early history, the Sarvāstivāda Vinaya was the most common vinaya tradition in China. However, Chinese Buddhism later settled on the Dharmaguptaka Vinaya. In the 7th century, Yijing wrote that in eastern China, most people followed the Dharmaguptaka Vinaya, while the Mahāsāṃghika Vinaya was used in earlier times in Guanzhong (the region around Chang'an), and that the Sarvāstivāda Vinaya was prominent in the Yangzi River area and further south. In the 7th century, the existence of multiple Vinaya lineages throughout China was criticized by prominent Vinaya masters such as Yijing and Dao'an (654–717). In the early 8th century, Daoan gained the support of Emperor Zhongzong of Tang, and an imperial edict was issued that the saṃgha in China should use only the Dharmaguptaka Vinaya for ordination.

Āgamas
Scholars at present have "a nearly complete collection of sūtras from the Sarvāstivāda school" thanks to a recent discovery in Afghanistan of roughly two-thirds of the Dīrgha Āgama in Sanskrit. The Madhyama Āgama (T26, Chinese trans. Gotama Saṅghadeva) and Saṃyukta Āgama (T99, Chinese trans. Guṇabhadra) have long been available in Chinese translation. The Sarvāstivāda is therefore the only early school besides the Theravada for which we have a roughly complete sutra collection, although unlike the Theravada it has not all been preserved in the original language.

Abhidharma
During the first century, the Sarvāstivāda abhidharma primarily consisted of the Abhidharmahrdaya authored by Dharmashresthin, a native from Tokharistan, and the Ashtagrantha authored/compiled by Katyayaniputra. Both texts were translated by Samghadeva in 391 AD and in 183 AD. respectively, but they were not completed until 390 in Southern China.

The Sarvāstivāda Abhidharma consists of seven texts:

Jñānaprasthāna ("Foundation of Knowledge") (T. 1543–1544)
Prakaraṇapāda ("Exposition") (T. 1541–1542)
Vijñānakāya ("Body of Consciousness") (T. 1539)
Dharmaskandha ("Aggregation of Dharmas") (T. 1537)
Prajñaptiśāstra ("Treatise on Designations") (T. 1538)
Dhātukāya ("Body of Elements") (T. 1540)
Saṅgītiparyāya ("Discourses on Gathering Together") (T. 1536)

Following these, are the texts that became the authority of the Vaibhāṣika:

Mahāvibhāṣā ("Great Commentary" on the Jñānaprasthāna) (T. 1545)

All of these works have been translated into Chinese, and are now part of the Chinese Buddhist canon. In the Chinese context, the word abhidharma refers to the Sarvāstivāda abhidharma, although at a minimum the Dharmaguptaka, Pudgalavada and Theravada also had abhidharmas.

Later Abhidharma manuals 
Various other Abhidharma works were written by Sarvāstivāda masters, some are more concise manuals of abhidharma, others critiqued the orthodox Vaibhāṣika views or provided a defense of the orthodoxy. Dhammajoti provides the following list of such later abhidharma works that are extant in Chinese: 108 109

 *Abhidharmāmṛta(-rasa)-śāstra (T no. 1553), by Ghoṣaka, 2 fasc., translator unknown. 2.
 *Abhidharmahṛdaya (T no. 1550) by Dharmaśrī, 4 fasc., tr. by Saṅghadeva et al. 3.
 *Abhidharmahṛdaya-sūtra (? T no. 1551) by Upaśānta, 2 fasc., tr. by Narendrayaśas.
 *Abhidharmahṛdayavyākhyā (? T no. 1552), by Dharmatrāta, 11 fasc., tr. by Sanghabhūti. 
 Abhidharmakośa-mūla-kārikā (T no. 1560) by Vasubandhu, 1 fasc., tr. by Xuan Zang. 6.
 Abhidharmakośabhāṣyam (T no. 1558) by Vasubandhu, 1 fasc., tr. by Xuan Zang; (there is also an earlier translation by Paramārtha: T no. 1559). 
 *Abhidharmakośaśāstra-tattvārthā-ṭīkā (T no. 1561) by Sthiramati, 2 fasc., translator unknown.
 *Abhidharma-nyāyānusāra (T no. 1562) by Saṃghabhadra, 40 fasc., tr. by Xuan Zang.
 *Abhidharma-samayapradīpikā (T no. 1563) by Saṃghabhadra, 40 fasc., tr. by Xuan Zang. 
 *Abhidharmāvatāra (T no. 1554) by Skandhila, 2 fasc., tr. by Xuan Zang.

Appearance and language

Appearance 
Between 148 and 170 CE, the Parthian monk An Shigao came to China and translated a work which described the color of monastic robes (Skt. kāṣāya) utilized in five major Indian Buddhist sects, called Da Biqiu Sanqian Weiyi (大比丘三千威儀). Another text translated at a later date, the Śāriputraparipṛcchā, contains a very similar passage with nearly the same information. In the earlier source, the Sarvāstivāda are described as wearing dark red robes, while the Dharmaguptas are described as wearing black robes. However, in the corresponding passage found in the later Śāriputraparipṛcchā, the Sarvāstivāda are described as wearing black robes and the Dharmaguptas as wearing dark red robes. In traditions of Tibetan Buddhism, which follow the Mūlasarvāstivāda Vinaya, red robes are regarded as characteristic of their tradition.

Language 
During the first century BCE, in the Gandharan cultural area (consisting of Oddiyana, Gandhara and Bactria, Tokharistan, across the Khyber Pass), the Sthaviriyas used the Gāndhārī language to write their literature using the Kharosthi.

The Tibetan historian Buton Rinchen Drub wrote that the Mahāsāṃghikas used Prākrit, the Sarvāstivādins used Sanskrit, the Sthavira nikāya used Paiśācī, and the Saṃmitīya used Apabhraṃśa.

Influence
The  is thought to have been authored around 150 CE, around the time of Kaniṣka (127–151 CE) of the Kuṣāṇa Empire. This massive treatise of Abhidharma (200 fascicles in Chinese) contains a great deal of material with what appear to be strong affinities to Mahāyāna doctrines. The  is also said to illustrate the accommodations reached between the Hīnayāna and Mahāyāna traditions, as well as the means by which Mahāyāna doctrines would become accepted. The  also defines the Mahāyāna sūtras and the role in their Buddhist canon. Here they are described as Vaipulya doctrines, with "Vaipulya" being a commonly used synonym for Mahāyāna. The  reads:

According to a number of scholars, Mahāyāna Buddhism flourished during the time of the Kuṣāṇa Empire, and this is illustrated in the form of Mahāyāna influence on the Mahāvibhāṣā Śāstra. The Mañjuśrīmūlakalpa also records that Kaniṣka presided over the establishment of Prajñāpāramitā doctrines in the northwest of India. Étienne Lamotte has also pointed out that a Sarvāstivāda master is known to have stated that the Mahāyāna Prajñā sūtras were to be found amongst their Vaipulya sūtras. According to Paul Williams, the similarly massive Mahāprajñāpāramitāupadeśa also has a clear association with the Vaibhāṣika Sarvāstivādins.

The Vaibhāṣika and Sautrāntika subschools are both classified in the Tibetan tenets system as the two tenets of the Hinayana, ignoring other early Indian Buddhist schools, which were not known to the Tibetans.

Sarvāstivādin meditation teachers also worked on the Dhyāna sutras, a group of early Buddhist meditation texts which were translated into Chinese and became influential in the development of Chinese Buddhist meditation methods.

References

Sources

Cox, Collett; Dessein, Bart; Willemen, Charles (1998). Sarvāstivāda Buddhist Scholasticism. BRILL, Handbuch Der Orientalistik. Leiden, New York, Koln. ISBN 9004102310.

Further reading
 For a critical examination of the Sarvāstivādin interpretation of the Samyuktagama, see David Kalupahana, Causality: The Central Philosophy of Buddhism. 
 For a Sautrantika refutation of the Sarvāstivādin use of the Samyuktagama, see Theodore Stcherbatsky, The Central Conception of Buddhism and the Meaning of the Word Dharma.. Theodore Stcherbatsky, The Central Conception of Buddhism and the Meaning of the Word Dharma. Asian Educational Services, 2003, page 76. This is a reprint of a much earlier work and the analysis is now quite dated; the first appendix however contains translations of polemical materials.

Nikaya schools
Sthaviravāda
Early Buddhist schools
Sarvāstivāda